Frederick Huth Jackson  (1863–1921), was a British banker, and a partner of the merchant bank, Frederick Huth & Co, founded by his great-grandfather, Frederick Huth.

Early life
He was the son of Thomas Hughes Jackson (1834–1930) and Hermine Meinertzhagen (1838–1897), and the grandson of Sir William Jackson, 1st Baronet. He was educated at Harrow School, and  Balliol College, Oxford.

Career
He was a partner of the private bank, Frederick Huth & Co.

From 1918 to 1919, the Rt. Hon. Frederick Huth Jackson, of 64 Rutland Gate, SW was the High Sheriff of the County of London.

Following the death of Jackson in 1921, Frederick Huth & Co was in an increasingly parlous state, and the Governor of the Bank of England pushed for it to be amalgamated with Konig Brothers, which duly happened in 1923.

Personal life

In 1894, he married the poet and author Claire Annabel Caroline Grant Duff, the eldest daughter of Sir Mountstuart Grant Duff and Anna Julia Webster.

They had four children (all Huth Jackson):
Frederick, who married Helen Vinogradoff, daughter of the historian Sir Paul Vinogradoff
Konradin, who married Sir Arthur Hobhouse
Anne Marie, who became a writer. She married Christopher Evelyn Fremantle and settled in the US
Claire Annabel, who married Louis de Loriol and settled in France

Legacy
John Singer Sargent painted a portrait of his wife, Mrs. Huth Jackson (née Annabel Grant Duff).

Arms

References

1863 births
1921 deaths
Alumni of Balliol College, Oxford
British bankers
High Sheriffs of the County of London
Frederick
Members of the Privy Council of the United Kingdom
People educated at Harrow School
People of the Victorian era